Loss of control may refer to:
 Loss of control (aeronautics), a condition that can lead to an aircraft crash.
 Loss of control (defence), a legal defence for murder, reducing the conviction to manslaughter
 "Loss of Control", a song by Green Day from the album ¡Uno!
 "Loss of Control", a song by Van Halen from the album Women and Children First